Reliez Valley is a census-designated place in Contra Costa County, California. The 2010 United States census reported Reliez Valley's population was 3,101.

Geography
According to the United States Census Bureau, the CDP has a total area of 2.363 square miles (6.120 km), all of it land.

Demographics
At the 2010 census Reliez Valley had a population of 3,101. The racial makeup of Reliez Valley was 2,693 (86.8%) White, 31 (1.0%) African American, 4 (0.1%) Native American, 233 (7.5%) Asian, 2 (0.1%) Pacific Islander, 30 (1.0%) from other races, and 108 (3.5%) from two or more races. Hispanic or Latino of any race were 192 people (6.2%).

The census reported that 3,077 people (99.2% of the population) lived in households, 19 (0.6%) lived in non-institutionalized group quarters, and 5 (0.2%) were institutionalized.

There were 1,244 households, 342 (27.5%) had children under the age of 18 living in them, 820 (65.9%) were opposite-sex married couples living together, 57 (4.6%) had a female householder with no husband present, 25 (2.0%) had a male householder with no wife present.  There were 33 (2.7%) unmarried opposite-sex partnerships, and 14 (1.1%) same-sex married couples or partnerships. 269 households (21.6%) were one person and 163 (13.1%) had someone living alone who was 65 or older. The average household size was 2.47.  There were 902 families (72.5% of households); the average family size was 2.86.

The age distribution was 602 people (19.4%) under the age of 18, 142 people (4.6%) aged 18 to 24, 498 people (16.1%) aged 25 to 44, 1,157 people (37.3%) aged 45 to 64, and 702 people (22.6%) who were 65 or older.  The median age was 50.5 years. For every 100 females, there were 93.8 males.  For every 100 females age 18 and over, there were 91.5 males.

There were 1,300 housing units at an average density of ,of which 1,244 were occupied, 1,031 (82.9%) by the owners and 213 (17.1%) by renters.  The homeowner vacancy rate was 1.1%; the rental vacancy rate was 10.1%.  2,656 people (85.6% of the population) lived in owner-occupied housing units and 421 people (13.6%) lived in rental housing units.

Education
Much of Reliez Valley is in the Lafayette Elementary School District and the Acalanes Union High School District. Other parts are in K-12 districts: some in Martinez Unified School District and some in Mount Diablo Unified School District.

References

Census-designated places in Contra Costa County, California
Census-designated places in California